Mistelbach an der Zaya (Mistelbach on the (River) Zaya; Central Bavarian: Mistlboch) is a town in the northeast of Austria in Lower Austria, one of Austria's nine federal states. It is located roughly 40 km northeast of Austria's capital Vienna. Furthermore, it consists of 8 subordinated municipalities.

Geographical location
Mistelbach is located in the North East of Lower Austria's Wine Quarter (Weinviertel), approximately 25 to 30 km from the Czech and the Slovak borders. It lies next to the main road connection between Brno (Czech Republic) and Vienna (Road B7).

History
Early settlements in the Mistelbach area can be traced back to pre-Christian times.

Around 1130 Mistelbach was mentioned on official deeds for the first time. After the Lords of Mistelbach had ceased around 1370 the initially royal estates of Wilfersdorf were given to the House of Lichtenstein.

Mistelbach was granted its first right to hold markets in 1372. Today, the town still hosts four markets per year. Mistelbach received its town charter July 5, 1874.

In the 19th century Mistelbach was strongly influenced by its connection to the Austrian Eastern Railway. It eventually became the district's capital and schools were built. In the 20th century Mistelbach experienced difficulties caused by its geographical proximity to the Iron Curtain. Nevertheless, the town developed into a regional center of the Eastern Winequarter (Weinviertel).

Population
According to the 2011 census, Mistelbach had 10,963 residents, compared to a 2001 census population of 10,644. In 1991 Mistelbach counted 10,234 residents, in 1981 10,251 and in 1971 10,235.

Politics
The post of mayor is held by Mr. Chrisitan Balon. Mr. Gabauer acts as Chief Municipal Officer.
After local elections March 6, 2005 the 37 seats of the Municipal Council are divided as follows:
ÖVP (Austrian Christian Democratic Party): 20 seats, SPÖ (Austrian Social Democratic Party): 11 seats, LAB: 3 seats, Green Party of Austria: 2 seats, and FPÖ (Austrian Freedom Party): 1 seat.

Schools
 HTL (Higher Technical School) for Healthcare Technologies
 HAK & HAS (Higher Commercial Academy/Higher Commercial School)
 BORG (Grammar School)
 HS (Public School)
 VS (Elementary School)
 ASO (School for Mentally Handicapped Children)
 Vocational School
 Wine Farmer's School
 Nurse's Training School

Sights

 Gothic Church on Church Hill
 built around 1500, with a gothic Madonna out of sandstone			
 Romanic mortuary (Karner)
 built around 1200					
 Town Hall
 Trinity Column
 Baroque castle (Barockschlößl) in Museum Lane (Museumsgasse)
 Monastery of the Fraternity of the Barnabiten
 built 1687, with precious ceiling frescos by Kainz, Rossaforte and Maulpertsch	
 Column commemorating Mistelbach's suffering under the Black Death (Pestsäule)
 Weather Station in Mistelbach's Town Park
 Town center (Stadtsaal)
 Museum Center Mistelbach
 including the Hermann Nitsch Museum, opened in May 2007
 Hermann Nitsch lived near Mistelbach, in the small village of Prinzendorf. The artist is famous for his unconventional style and for his performance art, for which he also faces considerable criticism.
 Culture Scenery (Kulturlandschaft) around Paasdorf
 Historic Barn (Hofstadl), built in the 19th century in the so-called ship-body style Siebenhirten.

Mistelbach is also home to one of the region's most popular, though traditional Vienna-style coffee houses "Cafe Harlekin" which has become an icon of the city's lifestyle over the years.

Subordinated municipalities
 Ebendorf
 Eibesthal
 Frättingsdorf
 Hörersdorf
 Hüttendorf, within the municipality of Mistelbach
 Kettlasbrunn
 Lanzendorf, within the municipality of Mistelbach
 Paasdorf
 Siebenhirten

Economy and infrastructure 
In 2001 there were 583 non-agricultural enterprises in Mistelbach. In 1999 agriculture- and forestry-related enterprises amounted to 281. According to 2001 census data 4,776 people out of the total population worked in Mistelbach. The labor force participation rate is 45.9%.

Gallery

Notable people
 Oswald Kabasta, conductor

References

External links 

 ivinginmistelbach.at

Cities and towns in Mistelbach District